"Lean and Dabb" is a song by American rapper iLoveMemphis, that song was released on November 10, 2015.

Music video 
The song's accompanying music video premiered on January 25, 2016 on iLoveMemphis's YouTube account on YouTube.

Commercial performance
"Lean and Dabb" debuted at number 98 on the Billboard Hot 100 for the chart dated February 6, 2016.

Charts

References

External links

2015 singles
2015 songs
American hip hop songs
Songs about dancing